= The Independence Generation of Armenian Writers =

The Independence Generation of Armenian writers is a group of writers whose literature was created after the independence of Armenia in 1991.

With the establishment of online literary magazine Granish, as well as the literary newmapaper Gretert a new generation of writers came into light.
